The Purcellville Cannons are a collegiate summer baseball team in Purcellville, Virginia.  They play in the north division of the Valley Baseball League. The team plays its home games at Fireman's Field, located adjacent to historic Bush Tabernacle.

History
The Wranglers were the second team to represent Luray in the Valley League.  The Luray Colonials competed in the Valley League from 1958-1969.  The Colonials won the Valley Baseball League championship for four years straight, from 1965-1968.

In 2000, baseball returned to the town of Luray and that following June, the team took the field for the first time as the Wranglers.  In the 2001 season, the Wranglers had a record of 13 wins and 27 losses.
In 2002, the Wranglers finished with a record of 15 wins and 25 losses.
In 2003, the Wranglers finished with a record of 15 wins and 25 losses.
In 2004, the Wranglers finished with their first record above .500 and finished in second place in the Northern Division.  The Wranglers final record was 23-21.
In 2005, the Wranglers were the Northern Division regular season champions/pennant winners, with an impressive record of 30 wins and 14 losses.  They were the most successful in the team's short history, however they fell in the playoffs.
The Wranglers completed the regular season with 31 wins and 21 losses and were the 2006 Northern Division Champions and the 2006 Valley Baseball League Champions, with a final record of 38 wins and 23 losses.  
In 2007, the Wranglers received the #3 seed, advanced to the championship round, and became league runner up.  Their regular season record was 26 wins and 18 losses.
In 2008, the Wranglers completed the regular season with a record of 30 wins and 14 losses.  The Wranglers won the 2008 Jim Lineweaver Cup, after defeating Covington in the Championship.  Their final record was 37 wins and 15 losses, the best record in Wranglers history.
In 2010, The Luray Wranglers won the Valley League Baseball Championship with a record of 33-18.
At the end of the 2012 season the Wranglers moved to Charles Town, WV and became the Cannons.
In September 2015 the Cannons moved from Charles Town, WV to their current home in Purcellville, VA.

Additional notes
†=The Colonials left the Valley League in 1971 and became part of the Rockingham County Baseball League, before disbanding in 1973.

Yearly Results

Results by Season (2016 - Present)

Cannons in the Pros

References

External links

Valley Baseball League

Amateur baseball teams in West Virginia
Valley Baseball League teams
Jefferson County, West Virginia
Baseball teams established in 1958
Baseball teams established in 2012
1958 establishments in Virginia
2012 establishments in West Virginia